Freedland is a surname. Notable people with the surname include:

 Jonathan Freedland (born 1967), English journalist and author
 Mark Freedland, English professor of employment law and author 
 Michael Freedland (1934–2018), British journalist, biographer, and broadcaster

See also
 Freeland (surname)